The End of Love is a drama film written and directed by Mark Webber. It stars Michael Cera, Amanda Seyfried and Mark Webber. It premiered at the 2012 Sundance Film Festival and was released theatrically in the United States on March 1, 2013.

Plot
When the mother of his infant son unexpectedly dies, struggling actor Mark (Mark Webber) grapples with fatherhood and his inability to grow up. And when he sparks with a single mother, he learns how his choices have real-life consequences.

Cast
Mark Webber as himself
Shannyn Sossamon as Lydia
Issac Love as himself
Jason Ritter as himself
Frankie Shaw as Evelyn
Amanda Seyfried as herself
Michael Cera as himself
Jocelin Donahue as herself
Aubrey Plaza as herself
Michael Angarano as himself
Alia Shawkat as herself
Jeff Baena as himself

Reception 
On review aggregator website Rotten Tomatoes, the film holds an approval rating of 59% based on 17 critic reviews, with an average rating of 6.71/10. According to Metacritic, which compiled 13 reviews and calculated a weighted average score of 56 out of 100, the film received "mixed or average reviews".

References

External links
 
 
 Sundance 2012: First Images from THE END OF LOVE
 Filmguide Sundance: All Films U.S. Dramatic
 Hollywood Reporter: The End of Love: Sundance Film Review
 Moviefone
 Indiewire
 mb.com

2012 films
Variance Films films
2010s English-language films
Films directed by Mark Webber